Valhalla Centre is a hamlet in northern Alberta, Canada within the County of Grande Prairie No. 1.

It is located in the Peace River Country at the junction of Highway 59 and Highway 723, northeast of the Village of Hythe and west of the Town of Sexsmith.

The hamlet is located in Census Division No. 19 and in the federal riding of Peace River.

History 
The hamlet was founded in 1912 by Scandinavians that moved north from Edson. It was named by Reverend Halvar N. Ronning after Valhalla, Odin's hall in Norse mythology. The first post office was established in 1916. The settlement grew around a creamery until 1945. The Melsness Mercantile building was built in 1925, and functioned as a store and post office until 1951. Today it hosts a museum dedicated to the Scandinavian heritage of the area, and was declared a Provincial Historic Site.

Demographics 

Economy 
The economy is centred on farming and stock raising.

Amenities 
The hamlet has a church (Valhalla Lutheran Church), curling rink, skating rink, museum and K-8 school (Valhalla Community School).  The school is one of 13 publicly funded Alberta Chartered Schools.

See also 
List of communities in Alberta
List of designated places in Alberta
List of hamlets in Alberta

References

External links 
Valhalla Community School

County of Grande Prairie No. 1
Hamlets in Alberta
Designated places in Alberta